Richard Dean McIntyre (October 5, 1956 – October 30, 2007) was an American lawyer, politician, and judge from the state of Indiana.

Early life
He was born in 1956 and his original ambition was to become a Navy Pilot.  He enrolled in Naval air training in Pensacola, but was forced to quit after a knee injury. He then entered law school in Bloomington, Indiana, and also entered the Indiana National Guard, where he became a military lawyer and rose to the rank of Colonel.

Political career
In 1980 he entered politics and ran successfully for the Indiana House of Representatives to which he was reelected two years later.

1984 U.S. House of Representatives election 
In 1984, he ran for the U.S. House of Representatives against freshman Democrat Frank McCloskey. Initial returns put McCloskey in the lead by 72 votes, but after a tabulation error was found a month later McIntyre took the lead by 34 votes and was certified a winner even though a recount was still underway. The recount was still underway when the new House was sworn in, and so the Democratically-controlled House voted, along party lines, to seat neither contestant, but to pay them both as though they were congressmen. Normally the House seats a certified winner on a provisional basis, but not if a recount is underway.

The recount was completed by the end of January 1985; the final result had McIntyre ahead by 418 votes. He was again certified the winner and, after Republicans forced a vote on the matter, again denied a seat, though the House Administration Committee promised to resolve the matter in 45 days. A federal recount, led by the Government Accounting Office under rules that were mostly agreed upon on bipartisan basis, found that McCloskey won by four votes, though the task force made several controversial decisions which led the task force's lone Republican to compare it to being raped. Republicans then sough to seat neither candidate and have a new election, but the House, on a party-line vote chose to seat McCloskey causing House Republicans to stage a symbolic walkout, protest with procedural delays and declare the race stolen.

Later career

McIntyre was interested in running for Lieutenant Governor in 1986, but was persuaded to seek a rematch with McCloskey. By this time, President Ronald Reagan was less popular than in 1984 and McIntyre was outspent. As a result, McCloskey won by a 53% to 47% margin.

McIntyre lost interest in the national arena and was appointed a Lawrence County Circuit Court Judge in 1988. He was reelected without opposition in 1990, 1996, and 2002, and served until his death.

Personal life and death
McIntyre lived in Bedford, Indiana. He married Meredith Mettlen in 1979, and they had three children.

On October 30, 2007, McIntyre died at his home, aged 51, from an apparent suicide through carbon monoxide poisoning. He was under federal investigation, regarding possible involvement in a scandal involving the purchase of furniture through a military scandal. At the time of his death, McIntyre was a member of the Indiana National Guard, 76th Infantry Brigade Combat team, serving as a judge advocate and preparing for deployment to Iraq.

Notes

External links

|-

|-

1956 births
2007 deaths
2007 suicides
20th-century American judges
20th-century American lawyers
20th-century American politicians
21st-century American judges
21st-century American lawyers
21st-century American politicians
American politicians who committed suicide
Candidates in the 1984 United States elections
Candidates in the 1986 United States elections
Indiana National Guard personnel
Indiana University Maurer School of Law alumni
Indiana lawyers
Indiana state court judges
United States Army Judge Advocate General's Corps
Republican Party members of the Indiana House of Representatives
People from Bedford, Indiana
Suicides by carbon monoxide poisoning
Suicides in Indiana